The Politician is a play published in 1655.

The Politician or The Politicians may also refer to:

Politician
The Politician (1963 book), a 1963 book by Robert Welch, founder of the John Birch Society
The Politician (book), a 2010 book about the US presidential candidate John Edwards
The Politician (TV series), a Netflix series created by Ryan Murphy
"Politician", a song by Cream from their 1968 album Wheels of Fire
SS Politician, a ship whose sinking inspired Whisky Galore!
Chicago Politicians, an American football team 
The Politicians, a New Zealand rock/new wave/reggae band formed in 1981